The Korets–Landau leaflet was authored by the Soviet physicists Mosey Korets and Lev Landau in 1938, and condemned Joseph Stalin and the NKVD as the response to the Great Purge in the Soviet Union.

The Soviet leader Stalin was accused for betrayal of the October Revolution and the sociopolitical work of his regime, especially the secret police NKVD, was compared with the ones organized by German Nazi leader Adolf Hitler and the Italian Fascism leader Benito Mussolini, who at this time made active political struggle against Communism in their countries and were both ideological and political enemies of the Soviet Union. In making the opposition against Stalinism, the leaflet had made use of purely socialist ideas. In particular, it had used as the title the communist ideological slogan "Workers of the world, unite" borrowed from The Communist Manifesto by Karl Marx and Friedrich Engels which laid the ideological foundations of Stalin's All-Union Communist Party (bolsheviks).

Creation of the leaflet was greatly motivated by the UPTI affair, which resulted in a serial liquidation of then leading Soviet scientists. Its propagation was planned on the International Workers' Day 1 May 1938, but did not come into the effect because was discovered by the NKVD which arrested the authors. The investigation, which included then usually applied brutal hearings, showed that the leaflet was compiled by Korets and edited by Landau. Some historians have supposed that its creation was a result of the wide provocation action performed among the Jewish scientists by the NKVD, which aimed at a many-year imprisonment  at the Gulag concentration camps system for the forced labor in the Soviet military industry. Korets pointed out that the Jewish poet Pavel Kogan was the NKVD's instigator for the leaflet. Together with Landau and Korets also the Soviet physicist Yuri Rumer was arrested. Landau was released thanks to Pyotr Kapitsa's support, but both Korets and Rumer were imprisoned for the forced labor.

Original text

English translation

References 

1938 in the Soviet Union
1938 documents
Stalinism
Great Purge